Edward James Young (January 16, 1878 – October 17, 1966) was a Canadian politician and farmer. He was elected to the House of Commons of Canada in 1925 as a Member of the Liberal Party representing the riding of Weyburn. He was re-elected to Weyburn in 1926 and 1930 but defeated in 1935 by Tommy Douglas of the Co-operative Commonwealth Federation (CCF) in his first election. 

He is portrayed in the 2006 CBC Television special Prairie Giant: The Tommy Douglas Story by Nicholas Campbell.

References

1878 births
1966 deaths
Liberal Party of Canada MPs
Members of the House of Commons of Canada from Saskatchewan
Politicians from Winnipeg